The Aquatics events at the 1982 Commonwealth Games were held at the new Chandler Aquatic Centre that was part of the Sleeman Sports Complex which had been purpose-built for the games.

Swimming

The following are the Swimming medal winners at the 1982 Commonwealth Games:

Men's events

Women's events

Swimming medal table

Diving

1982 Commonwealth Games events
Commonwealth Games
Commonwealth Games
1982